Journey to the West is a 2014 French-Taiwanese film directed by Tsai Ming-liang. The title is inspired by the 16th century Chinese literary classic of the same name. It had its world premiere at the Panorama section of the 64th Berlin International Film Festival in February 2014. It is an entry in Tsai's "Walker series" of films.

Synopsis
The film content consists almost entirely of long, minimalist sequences showing a Buddhist monk in saffron robe walking very (almost imperceptibly) slowly — according to the Zen kinhin (walking meditation) practice —  through public spaces in Marseilles, France, while passersby swarm around him. It begins, however, with a long, extreme closeup on the French actor Denis Lavant, who is later seen again following behind the monk and matching his every move exactly.

Release
Journey to the West is included among the "Extras" on the Stray Dogs Blu-ray from Cinema Guild.

References

External links

Films directed by Tsai Ming-liang
French drama films
Taiwanese drama films
2014 films
Films with screenplays by Tsai Ming-liang
2010s French films